Lehal (also spelled as Laihl , Lahel) is a surname. Notable people with the surname include:

 A.S. Lehal (born 1981), Indian golfer
 Gurpreet Singh Lehal (born 1963), Indian computer science professor
 Karam Lehal (born 1994), Indian skeet shooter

Indian surnames